This is a list of notable Saraikis.

Poet
Khawaja Ghulam Farid
Ahmad Khan Tariq
Akbar Makhmoor
Shakir Shuja Abadi
Gopi Chand Narang
Tehzeeb Haafi
Zaheer Maharvi
Irfan Muhammad
Asghar Gurmani
Afkar Alvi
Momin Molai
Muhammad Nadeem Bhaba

Music
Shafaullah Rokhri
Attaullah Khan Esakhelvi
Ahmad Nawaz Cheena
Javed Hassan
Mushtaq Ahmad Cheena
Pathany Khan
Zeeshan Rokhri
Afshan Zebi
Ramzan Bewas
Tahir Farooq Jamwani
Farooq Asif Sikhani
Irshad Lashari
Shehzad Lashari
Adeel Sanwal
Irshad Sanjrani
Mukhtiar Sanwal

Politics
Hina Rabbani Khar
Jahangir Khan Tareen
Makhdum Ahmad Mehmood
Sajjad Hussain Qureshi
Yousaf Raza Gillani
Makhdoom Shah Mehmood Qureshi 
Makhdum Khusro Bakhtiar 
Mustafa Khar
Makbdum Javed Hashni

Scholar
Ismail Ahmedani
Athar Ali Khan Panwar
Satish Dhawan

Journalist
Prabhu Chawla
Vinod Dua
Rauf Klasra

Lists of people by ethnicity